is a Japanese actress, voice actress, J-pop singer and radio personality. She graduated from Kasukabe Kyōei High School and went on to major in Communications at Tamagawa University in Machida City, Tokyo, graduating in 1990. Kouda has had at least one song appear on the program Minna no Uta.

She was a member of the J-pop voice acting group, Drops, until they disbanded. They were most well known for singing the ending theme to the anime Doki Doki School Hours although they did perform a couple of concerts one of which was released on DVD.

She works for the talent management firm Aoni Production. Her most notable roles include Okinu from Ghost Sweeper Mikami, Miki Koishikawa from Marmalade Boy and Shaorin from Mamotte Shugogetten.

Filmography

Television animation 
Anime World Fairytales (Gretel)
Black Jack (Rei Asato)
Bobobo-bo Bo-bobo (Ruby, Denbo)
Chance Pop Session (Reika)
CLAMP School Detectives (Miyuki)
Crayon Shin-chan (Young Witch Marie)
Detective Academy Q (Mitsuru Hōshō)
Digimon Savers (Sayuri Daimon)
Doraemon (Yukari Aozora, Maho, girl)
Fortune Quest (Max)
Ghost Sweeper Mikami (Okinu)
Goldfish Warning! (Shuko)
Gun X Sword (Vivian)
HappinessCharge PreCure! (Queen Mirage)
Haunted Junction (Hanako Hasegawa)
Jibaku-kun (Kuinsheru)
Kaginado (Nayuki Minase)
Kamisama Kazoku (Fumiko Komori)
Kanon (Nayuki Minase)
Kemono Friends (Moose)
Kyōryū Bōkenki Jura Tripper (Ojō)
Mamotte Shugogetten (Shaorin)
Marmalade Boy (Miki Koishikawa)
Masamune-kun's Revenge (Momo)
Meiken Lassie (Priscilla)
Monster Farm (Holly)
Nintama Rantarō (Yuki)
Nyaruko: Crawling With Love (Luhy Distone)
One Piece (Kaya)
Panpaka Pants (Croli)
Pokémon (Sakura)
Princess Connect! Re:Dive (Misato)
Rosario + Vampire Capu2 (Mako Yakumaru)
Shūkan Storyland (Nami)
Smile PreCure! (Ikuyo Hoshizora)
The Wonderful Galaxy of Oz (Dorothy)
Tanoshii Willow Town (Annie)
Ultraman Kids: 30,000,000 Light Years in Search of Mother (Nōji)
Vampire Knight (Juri Kuran)
Welcome to Demon School! Iruma-kun Season 3 (Vepar)
Xenosaga (Febronia)

OVA 
Denshin Mamotte Shugo Getten! (Shaorin)
Dirty Pair Flash (Yuri)
Dragon Half (Lufa)
Galaxy Fraulein Yuna (Shiori)
Gall Force Revolution (Catty Nebulart)
Gestalt (anime) (Suzu)
Harukaze Sentai V Force (Natsuki Aoi)
Hozuki's Coolheadedness (Toyotama-hime)
Idol Project (Mimu Emiruton)
Kanon (Nayuki Minase)
Maps (Hoshimi Kimizuka)
Miyuki-chan in Wonderland (Miyuki)
Ryūki Denshō (Myū)
Shonan Junai Gumi (Namiki Ibu)
Special Drama Fantasian na Nichijō (Madoka)
Spectral Force (Azerea)
The Super Dimension Fortress Macross II: Lovers, Again (Amy)
Tattoon Master (Nima)
Tekkaman Blade II (Yumi Francois)
Twinbee:Winpī no 1/8 Panic (Madoka)
Twinbee Paradise (Madoka)
Virgin Fleet (Ise Haruoshimi)

Theatrical animation 
A·LI·CE (Maria)
Dragon Quest: Dai no Bōken (Gome)
Ghost Sweeper Mikami (Okinu)
Marmalade Boy (Miki Koishikawa)
Spring and Chaos (Toshi)

Video games 
Aoi Namida (Mana Fujihara)
BS Zelda no Densetsu: Inishie no Sekiban (Princess Zelda)
Doki Doki Pretty League (Chiaki Nonohara)
Dōkyūsei (Yui Sakuragi)
Dragon Shadow Spell (Prinveil)
Dragon Knight III (Marie)
FIST (Masumi Dotsuki)
Free Talk Studio ~Mari no Kimama na O-Shaberi~ (Mari Kousaka, Natsumi Kawai)
Galaxy Fraulein Yuna series (Shiori)
Granblue Fantasy (Gabriel)
Hot Shots Golf (Nanako and Ayaka)
Kanon (Nayuki Minase)
Langrisser I & II (Liana, Lána)
Makeruna! Makendō 2 (Madonna)
Medarot NAVI (NAVI, Navi-Commun)
Megami Paradise II (Lilith)
Mitsumete Knight (Ann)
Otome-teki Koi Kakumei★Rabu Rebo!! (Natsumi)
Popful Mail (Mail (PC-Engine version))
Project X Zone 2 (Dr. Chizuru Urashima)
Puyo Puyo CD Tsu (Trio the Banshee)
Ryūki Denshō: Dragoon (Myū)
Super Real Mahjongg P IV (Aina)
Twinbee Paradise (Madoka)
Twinbee RPG (Madoka)
Xenosaga (Febronia)

Dubbing 
 Barbie as the Princess and the Pauper (Serafina)
 Freaks and Geeks (Lindsay Weir)
 Jawbreaker (Marcie Fox)
 Stressed Eric (Maria Gonzalez, Various)

Live action 
 Eat & Run (Marie)
 Looking For
 Setsunai
 Voice

Radio 
Banana Hōsōkyoku Young Radio Grand Prix
Chikada Haruo no Lion Package Song
Doyō no Yoru Desu: Uha Uha Daihōsō Anime Street
Furumoto Shinnosuke no Parachute Yūgekitai
Kobayashi Yutaka no Super Gang Nouveau
Kouda Mariko no Come On Funky Lips!
Kouda Mariko no Doki Doki On Air
Kouda Mariko no Game Museum
Kouda Mariko no GM (part of OBC's V-Station)
Kouda Mariko no Nebusoku Radio: Yume ha Sora Iro
Kouda Mariko no Taisetsu ni Oboerumono no ga Issho nara Ii yo ne
Kore ga Sō na no ne, Koneko-chan
MBS Radio Ore-tachi Yattemāsu Getsuyōbi
Mō Sugu Ore-tachi xxx Yattemāsu
Nazo Nazo Dreamin'''Ore-tachi YattemāsuOre-tachi xxx YattemāsuOre-tachi xxx Yattemāsu NextShao & Taisuke no Kon'ya mo Sugo GettenTensai! Hayamimi Radio-kun: Kouda Mariko no Honjitsu mo Game SanmaiTwinbee ParadiseTwinbee Paradise 2Twinbee Paradise 3TV Game Radions RUha Uha Daihōsō Anime StreetUltra Mania BanzaiVoice of Wonderland Other CD Data FANet Artist Information: Kouda MarikoIdol on StageMinna no Uta: Ame nochi SpecialMusic JumpMusic Voice: Seiyū Idol DaishūgōSeishun Adventure: Majo-tachi no TasogareYūshoku Banzai CX Discography 
Singles
Konami MusicBokura no Suteki (written by Masami Tozawa/ composed by Katsuki Maeda) / Harmony (composed by Miki Matsubara), 1994Mimikaki wo shiteiru to (written by Masami Tozawa/ composed by Toshio Kamei) / Dare no Sei demo nai Futari (written by Masami Tozawa/ composed by Miki Matsubara), 1995Watashi ga Tenshi dattara ii noni (written by Yoshiko Miura, Mariko Kouda/ composed by Miki Matsubara) / Machibuse (written/composed by Yumi Matsutōya), 1996Yume wa Hitori mirumono janai (composed by Miki Matsubara) / Owaranai Encore (composed by Akio Minami), 1996Egao de aishiteru (written/composed by Tomoko Tane) / Dore dake aisareru ka janakute (composed by Miki Matsubara),1997Kaze ga tomaranai (written/composed by Tomoko Tane) / Soba ni iru kara  (written/composed by Mariko Kouda), 1997Ame nochi Special (composed by Miki Matsubara) / Iidasenakute (composed by Uni Inoue), 1997Looking For (composed by Marron Nagatsuki) / Ōzora no Achira e (composed by Tatsuya Nishiwaki), 1998Cobalt (composed by Hideshi Hachino) / Sha-La-La~Futari~ (composed by Miki Matsubara), 1998Taisetsu ni Omoerumono ga issho nara ii yone (composed by Marron Nagatsuki) / Ganbare! Rōnin (composed by Uni Inoue), 1998Matte imashita (written/composed by Tomoko Tane) / Taiyō de ikō! (composed by Kaori Okui), 1999

King Records
On King RecordsChikyū no Omoi～Hoshi no Omoi～ / Ame Agari no Asa ni / Setsuna.Clear / Nemuri no UmiHachimitsu / Sekaichū no Post / Natsu Iro no HanaHana / Machi ni Kesarenaimono / Hifumi yoJiyū na Tsubasa / Daisuki Nandamono!Kara no Te no Hira / Namida  Kumo no Ue ni / Nichiyōbi no TaikutsuKimi ga Iru Sora / Yasashii TsukiKokoro no Yajirushi / Asa Iro no Wappen / Eki made no Michi woMonshirochō / Deatta Goro ni / Fukukaze no Naka deNiji ga Yonderu / Koi ha BōkenSabishigari ya no Koi / Wasurenai de～Forever We're Together～ / HenachokoSono Toki made / Spice / Boku no SeikatsuTa·ra·ra / Serial to Kiss / Haruka～To My Mother & Father on the Earth～Wish (as Shaorin)

DramaCD Drama: Eiyū Densetsu III: Shiroki Majo (Kurisu)Dengeki CD Bunko: Samurai Spirits (Nakoruru)Falcom Special Box '97 CD Drama: Eiyū Densetsu III vs. Brandish VT (Kurisu)Kishō Seireiki 1: Shūchū Gōu no Tsubishikata (Yumemi, Naiasu, Suhichimi, Ugaia)Kishō Seireiki 2: Tadashii Taifū no Okoshikata (Yumemi, Naiasu, Suhichimi, Ugaia)Kishō Seireiki 3: Shōryō-san to no Sugoshikata (Yumemi, Naiasu, Suhichimi, Ugaia)Popful Mail Paradise (Kachūsha)Popful Mail: The Next Generation (Kachūsha)TARAKO Pappara Paradise (Kachūsha)Tinkle Saver NOVA (Hayana Suzuna)Zelda no Densetsu Sound & Drama (Zelda)

AlbumsAitakuteB Side CollectionDaisuki na UtaHappy! Happy! Happy!Kiss (mini album)Kono Sora kara KikoeruMariko Kouda Concert Tour '95–'96: Owaranai EncoreMetronomeMy Best Friend (best album)My Best Friend 2 (best album)My Best Friend 3 (best album)Nande Datteba!?Neiro Enpitsu Jūni IroPurePure Energy (selection album)SoraTwinbee Vocal Paradise featuring Mariko Kouda (best album)Vitamin Punch!VividYatte MiyōOther albumsEru Sanku: Koiki na Kanajo-tachi (vol.1-5)GS Mikami Utsukushiki Dōbōsha (vol.1-5)Honki ni Shinai de / Itsuka May BeIdol Project Special CD (included in limited edition of game)Kimi ga Daisuki / Happy Birthday PresentKuchibiru ni PromiseMade in Heaven: Ai no BrideMelody: Dakishimete / StoryMinna Chikyū no Nakama-tachi: Pink no WaniMitsumete Knight Original Soundtrack (only includes Ann's game version of the song which is slightly different from the full version)Mitsumete Knight ~Vocalize~ (contains Ann's full version of her song)MomentSaigo no Yakusoku / Kyō no Owari niSeiyū Grand Prix Club Special '95 '96Sunday IslandTenshi no Sugao'' (OVA insert CD single)

References

External links
  
  
 Mariko Kouda at the Seiyuu database
 

1969 births
Living people
Aoni Production voice actors
Japanese women singers
Japanese video game actresses
Japanese voice actresses
Musicians from Saitama Prefecture
Voice actresses from Saitama Prefecture